José Luis Zalazar Rodríguez (born 26 October 1963) is a Uruguayan retired footballer who played mostly as an attacking midfielder.

Nicknamed El Oso (Bear), he played most of his career in Spain, especially with Albacete Balompié, being part of the club's most long tenure in La Liga. He was also notable for his strong and accurate right-foot shot, as demonstrated with several goals from long distance, particularly from free kicks.

An Uruguay international for nearly one decade, Zalazar represented the country at the 1986 World Cup.

Club career
Born in Montevideo, Zalazar started his career at local club C.A. Peñarol in 1982. After the 1986 FIFA World Cup he joined Mexican club Universidad Autónoma de Guadalajara where, in his first year, he was the highest goalscorer of the tournament with 23 goals overall. He then moved to Spain, where he played with Cádiz CF one season before returning to Mexico for 1988–89, again with the Tecos.

Zalazar returned to Spain in 1989, playing one year in its second division with RCD Español. He then joined Albacete Balompié, where he would have his most successful period, playing six seasons and being part of the squad known as Queso Mecánico ("Clockwork Cheese"). He started his spell at the Castile-La Mancha team in the second level, scoring 15 times in all 38 matches in an eventual promotion – including two crucial ones against UD Salamanca.

During 1991–92's La Liga, Zalazar again played in all the games, adding 13 goals and helping Albacete finish in seventh place, the highest position ever reached by the club in the top division. His performances earned him the EFE Trophy by Spanish news agency EFE, awarded to the best Ibero-American player in the competition every year. During his career at Albacete, he also became the club's all-time leader in top level appearances, with 180 matches, and goals, with 57.

After Albacete was relegated back to division two at the end of 1995–96, Zalazar left for Racing de Santander for one single campaign. The following year he returned to Uruguay, playing the 1997 Apertura tournament for hometown's Club Nacional de Football and the Clausura for C.A. Bella Vista. After a brief retirement the 35-year-old rejoined Albacete, still in the second tier, leaving the game for good at the end of the season.

International career
Zalazar obtained a total of 29 caps for the Uruguay national team. Having made his official debut on 13 June 1984 against England in a 2–0 win, he was part of the squad at the 1986 FIFA World Cup, making his only appearance of the tournament during the second half of a group stage 1–6 loss to Denmark.

Zalazar also played six matches during the 1994 World Cup qualification process, his last representing Uruguay, which did not qualify.

Personal life
Zalazar have two sons and both of them are footballers. His elder son Kuki Zalazar is a former Spanish youth international and currently plays as forward for Real Valladolid B.

His younger son Rodrigo Zalazar is a Uruguay youth international and currently plays as a midfielder for Polish club Korona Kielce on loan from Bundesliga side Eintracht Frankfurt.

References

External links

National team data 

1963 births
Living people
Uruguayan people of Spanish descent
Footballers from Montevideo
Uruguayan footballers
Association football midfielders
Uruguayan Primera División players
Peñarol players
Club Nacional de Football players
C.A. Bella Vista players
Liga MX players
Tecos F.C. footballers
La Liga players
Segunda División players
Cádiz CF players
RCD Espanyol footballers
Albacete Balompié players
Racing de Santander players
Uruguay under-20 international footballers
Uruguay international footballers
1986 FIFA World Cup players
Uruguayan expatriate footballers
Expatriate footballers in Mexico
Expatriate footballers in Spain
Uruguayan expatriate sportspeople in Mexico
Uruguayan expatriate sportspeople in Spain